Edward Michael Jackman (February 29, 1868 – July 20, 1916) was a businessman and politician in Newfoundland. He represented Placentia and St. Mary's in the Newfoundland and Labrador House of Assembly from 1900 to 1909 as a Liberal.

He was born in St. John's, the son of Michael Jackman and Margaret Lanigan, and was educated there. He apprenticed as a tailor and worked in Boston and New York City before returning to St. John's in 1889 and setting up his own business. In 1890, Jackman married Alice F. Walsh. For a time, he was president of the tailors' union. Jackman served in the Executive Council as Minister of Finance and Customs. He was defeated when he ran for reelection in 1909. Jackman took part in a series of negotiations on union with Canada in 1915 and 1916; those negotiations were unsuccessful mainly because of William Coaker's opposition to the idea. Jackman died in Montreal at the age of 48 while visiting there on business.

References 

Members of the Newfoundland and Labrador House of Assembly
1868 births
1916 deaths
Members of the Executive Council of Newfoundland and Labrador
Government ministers of the Dominion of Newfoundland
Newfoundland Colony people
Politicians from St. John's, Newfoundland and Labrador